Lophogastridae is a family of crustaceans belonging to the order Lophogastrida.

Genera:
 Ceratolepis G.O.Sars, 1883
 Chalaraspidum Willemoes-Suhm, 1895
 Gnathophausia Willemoes-Suhm, 1873
 Lophogaster M.Sars, 1857
 Neognathophausia Petryashov, 1992
 Paralophogaster Hansen, 1910
 Pseudochalaraspidum Birstein & Tchindonova, 1962
 Sarsius Tonini, da Silva, Serpa Filho & Freitas, 2016

References

Lophogastrida